Denise Helene Gaudin Favart (22 September 1923 – 22 August 2016) was a French figure skater. She was born in Paris, France. As a pair skater, she competed with her husband Jacques Favart from 1946 to 1950. They won the gold medal at the French Figure Skating Championships four times and placed 14th at the 1948 Winter Olympics.

Competitive highlights
(with Jacques Favart)

 WD = Withdrawn

External links

References 

1923 births
2016 deaths
Figure skaters at the 1948 Winter Olympics
French female pair skaters
Olympic figure skaters of France
Figure skaters from Paris